"Take Me Home" is a song by American electronic music group Cash Cash, featuring American singer Bebe Rexha, taken from Cash Cash's second EP Overtime and their fourth studio album Blood, Sweat & 3 Years. "Take Me Home" was released digitally worldwide on July 15, 2013. In November 2013, the group recorded an acoustic version of "Take Me Home". A music video for the song was released on December 18, 2013.

Background
The song tells of a lover who, despite an unhealthy relationship with her partner, still wants to be with him. According to group member Jean Paul Makhlouf, the song was completed in two days. The song was also recorded in Makhlouf's parents basement.

Reception
"Take Me Home" was met with generally positive reviews. Bianca Gracie of Idolator stated, "Rexha's lush vocals combined with the thumping synthesized bassline make for a solid tune."

Music video
The music video for "Take Me Home" was released on December 18, 2013. The music video was directed by DJ Brawner and showcases a young couple on a road trip in alternating love-hate states. A music video for an acoustic version was released on November 7, 2013.

In popular culture
In the 2014 Stanley Cup Playoffs semi-final series between the Montreal Canadiens and the New York Rangers, the song can often be heard in the pre-game shows in the background while the song’s being played in the arena during pre-game warm-ups.

The song was used in several TV spots for the 2016 animated film Finding Dory.

Commercial performance
The song peaked at number fifty seven on the Billboard Hot 100 and sold 488,000 downloads in the US to date according to Nielsen SoundScan. Outside of the United States, "Take Me Home" peaked within the top ten of the charts in Australia and the United Kingdom, becoming Cash Cash's first charting song and global hit.

Charts

Weekly charts

Year-end charts

Certifications

References

External links 

2013 singles
2013 songs
Bebe Rexha songs
Cash Cash songs
Atlantic Records singles
Songs written by Bebe Rexha